The following is a list of colleges and universities in Houston, located within the city limits.

State universities
Four separate and distinct state universities are located in Houston.

The University of Houston is the flagship institution of the University of Houston System.  The University of Houston–Clear Lake and the University of Houston–Downtown are  universities; they are not branch campuses of the University of Houston.  Admission into each institution is separate, and each institution has distinct admission criteria and requirements.

Texas Southern University is the only independent state university in Houston and is one of the largest historically black universities in the U.S.

Community colleges
Colleges in or nearby Houston
 Houston Community College System
 Lone Star College System
 San Jacinto College
Other Community Colleges around Houston
 Alvin Community College
 Blinn College
 Brazosport College
 College of the Mainland
 Lee College
 Wharton County Junior College

Private universities

Nonsectarian
 Rice University, established in 1912,  is a private Tier One research university located at 6100 Main, Houston, Texas. Rice enrolled 3,001 undergraduate, 897 post-graduate, and 1,247 doctoral students and awarded 1,448 degrees in 2007. The university is organized into eight schools offering 40 undergraduate degree programs, 51 masters programs, and 29 doctoral programs.
 Strayer University, established in 1892, is a private college offering associate's, bachelor's and master's degree programs.  There are 3 campuses in the Houston area offering both on campus and online class options.
 Houston Graduate School of Theology
 North American University, established in 2007, is a private college offering bachelor's degree programs in three disciplines: computer science, business administration and education.
 American InterContinental University, 9999 Richmond Avenue, Houston, Texas, offers 2 associate degree programs, 24 bachelor programs, and 11 masters programs in 5 disciplines: business administration, accounting, criminal justice, healthcare management and information technology.

Sectarian

 The College of Biblical Studies, 7000 Regency Square Blvd., Houston, Texas, is a Bible college that is non-denominational. It is dual-accredited by SACS-COC and ABHE and was founded in 1976 by Rev. Ernest L. Mays. The school continues to strive to equip African American and other ethnic minority pastors to serve the church and the world through both English- and Spanish-language undergraduate degree offerings.
 Houston Christian University, 7502 Fondren Road, Houston, Texas, offers more than 50 undergraduate majors. Pre-professional programs range from Biblical languages to nursing.
 University of St. Thomas, located at 3800 Montrose, Houston, Texas, is a comprehensive Catholic university, grounded in the liberal arts. Founded by 1947 by Basilian Fathers, it serves as the only Catholic university in the Archdiocese of Galveston-Houston.

Law schools

Public
 Texas Southern University, Thurgood Marshall School of Law
 University of Houston Law Center

Private
 South Texas College of Law

Independent schools
 Center for Advanced Legal Studies

Health institutions

Public

 Institute of Biosciences and Technology
 Prairie View A&M University College of Nursing
 Texas Southern University School of Pharmacy and Health Science
 Texas Woman's University Health Science Center Houston
 University of Houston College of Medicine
 University of Houston College of Optometry
 University of Houston College of Pharmacy
 The University of Texas Health Science Center at Houston
 MD Anderson Cancer Center

Private

 Baylor College of Medicine
 Memorial Hermann Clinical Innovation and Research Institute (CIRI)
 The Methodist Hospital Research Institute
 Texas Children's Hospital

Former institutions
 Christian College of America
 Gulf Coast Bible College (moved to Oklahoma City, Oklahoma in 1985)
 South Texas Junior College

See also
 List of colleges and universities in Texas

References

Houston
Colleges and universities in Houston
Colleges and universities